Emmanouil Argyropoulos (1889 – 4 April 1913) was a Greek pioneer aviator of the early 20th century. Apart from being the first Greek aviator who performed a flight over his homeland, he also became the first casualty of Greek military aviation.

First flight in Greece
Argyropoulos, originally a civil engineer, abandoned his profession and went to Paris in order to study aeronautics. At the end of January 1912, he acquired his pilot license and returned to Greece together with a privately owned Nieuport IV.G 50-hp aircraft. On 8 February 1912, Argyropoulos became the first Greek aviator to perform a flight in Greece, an event that was widely commented upon in the local press. After taking off from the Rouf district of Athens, he performed a 16-minute-long flight around the city, including an overflight of the Acropolis. An hour later he carried out a second flight, this time with Prime Minister Eleftherios Venizelos as his passenger. Venizelos, was enthusiastic about the concept of aerial warfare, and stated that Greece should immediately take advantage of this newly invented weapon.

Balkan Wars and death
When the Balkan Wars broke out in October 1912, he joined the military aviation with the rank of Lieutenant. On 4 April 1913, during a reconnaissance mission, his aircraft, a captured Ottoman Blériot XI, fell from a height of 600 m. while flying over the Langadas region near Thessaloniki. Both Argyropoulos and his passenger, the athlete and poet Konstantinos Manos, were killed. Argyropoulos thus became the first loss of Greek military aviation, and marked the end of air activities in the Balkan Wars.

References

1880s births
1913 deaths
Aviators killed in aviation accidents or incidents in Greece
Greek expatriates in France
Greek aviators
Greek military personnel killed in action
Greek military personnel of the Balkan Wars
Hellenic Army officers
Victims of aviation accidents or incidents in 1913
People from Thessaloniki (regional unit)